Nosa Afolabi, better known as Lasisi Elenu, is a Nigerian comedian, actor, compere from Offa, Kwara in Nigeria. One of Africa's most popular influencers, he is known for his skits with a 'wide mouth' disguise filter during performances and on social media. Elenu was recently featured in Netflix thriller, The Ghost and the Tout.

In 2018, he was nominated for The Future Awards Africa Prize for Comedy. In March 2020, he was named one of Nigeria's Top 25 Under-30 Nigerian Superstars. and he was one of the winners of the second edition of Trendupp Awards

Career 
The comedian is one of the continent's most popular social media influencers with 75,000 followers on TikTok and over 3.4 million followers on Instagram.

His skits focus on varying themes from law to cybercrime, the economy, insecurity and philosophy, started out as a musician before diverting to the business of comedy. He performed at the Mama Tobi Homecoming concert.

His most recent project, Mama & Papa Gods power, is a series of 16-minute episodes focusing on a low-income household in Nigeria.

Personal life 
In 2022, Lasisi Elenu proposed to his girlfriend Nonso Adika and the couple welcome a baby girl October of the same year.

Filmography 

 The Ghost and the Tout (2018)
 Made in Heaven
 Sylva
 The Razz Guy
 African Messiah

Controversy 
Controversy struck in July 2020 when Elenu was warned by members of the Nigerian Bar Association, who claimed his jokes were misrepresenting the legal profession and threatened to sue him.

References 

Living people
Nigerian male comedians
People from Kwara State
University of Ilorin alumni
Nigerian male actors
Nigerian male musicians
Year of birth missing (living people)
Nigerian comedians
Nigerian stand-up comedians